Gerald Fay Baker Jr. (June 19, 1931 – March 2, 2017) was an American author, entrepreneur, public speaker, and product spokesperson who wrote numerous books on gardening, home hints, and health topics. He was best known as "America's Master Gardener," and for creating his world-famous DIY tonics using common household products like beer, baby shampoo, castor oil, and mouthwash.

Biography 
Baker began his career in the 1960s as an undercover cop in Detroit, Michigan, posing as a gardener, tree trimmer, landscaper, and seed salesman. He left the police force and eventually went to work as a horticulture buyer for S. S. Kresge Corporation (which later became Kmart Corporation). Baker's interest in gardening led him to local radio and TV appearances in the Detroit area. He eventually became a frequent guest on Dinah Shore’s daytime TV show, Dinah’s Place. The exposure he received from his Dinah’s Place appearances prompted him to write his first best-selling book, Plants Are Like People, in 1971. A full-length record album by the same name was released shortly after the book was certified as a bestseller. Baker also began the national craze of talking to your plants with the publication of his second best-selling book,  Talk to Your Plants, in 1973.

In the 1970s, Baker was a frequent guest on TV shows like The Mike Douglas Show, The Merv Griffin Show, and The Tonight Show Starring Johnny Carson. He hosted his own TV show, Plants Are Like People, on KMOX (a CBS affiliate) in St. Louis, MO. Baker also often appeared as a gardening expert on TV morning shows like Kennedy and Company in Chicago and on the ABC affiliates’ morning shows in New York City, Detroit, and Los Angeles.

In the 1990s and 2000s, Baker had his own series of gardening shows that ran on Public Television stations in the US and Canada. They were used by PBS as pledge drive specials; the programs featured Baker's down-home wisdom and commonsense solutions to gardening problems. These shows are now available on DVD (see below), and various segments can also be viewed on YouTube. Baker also has appeared on QVC, selling his own private label merchandise. From 1987 to 2007, Baker hosted his own national call-in radio show called On the Garden Line, which was produced by Westwood One and broadcast on the Mutual Broadcasting Network.

Over the years, Baker had served as a product spokesperson for Jacobsen Lawn Mowers, Hudson Sprayers, U.S. Gypsum, and Plantabs. His big break came from his affiliation with the Garden Weasel, a tool for loosening soil. Baker appeared as the Garden Weasel's spokesperson in advertising materials, including radio and TV ads, print, and point-of-purchase displays. He became widely recognized for his signature line in the Garden Weasel TV commercial, “If you’re into gardening like I am…” In 1982, Baker returned to his roots, becoming the national gardening spokesperson for Kmart Corporation's Garden Centers, a relationship that lasted until 1996.

In 1987, Baker helped found American Master Products, Inc. (AMP), a direct marketing and multi-media company based in Wixom, Michigan. AMP owns and manages the Jerry Baker brand, develops content and private label products, and negotiates licensing deals.

AMP has published more than 50 books under the Jerry Baker brand name, with more than twenty million copies sold worldwide. AMP also published the popular “On the Garden Line” newsletter between 1988 and 2008.

Baker died on March 2, 2017, at age 85.

Books 
 Plants Are Like People, 1971
 Talk to Your Plants, 1973
 Make Friends with Your Lawn, 1973
 Make Friends with Your Roses, 1973
 Make Friends with Your Annuals, 1973
 Make Friends with Your Fruit Trees, 1973
 Make Friends with Your Vegetable Garden, 1973
 Make Friends with Your Evergreens and Ground Covers, 1973
 Make Friends with Your Bulbs, 1973
 Make Friends with Your Shade Trees, 1973
 Make Friends with Your House Plants, 1973
 Make Friends with Your Flowering Trees, 1973
 Make Friends with Your Flowering Shrubs, 1973
 Make Friends with Your Perennials and Biennials, 1973
 I Never Met a House Plant I Didn't Like, 1974
 The Impatient Gardener, 1983
 The Impatient Gardener's Lawn Book, 1987
 Jerry Baker's Fast, Easy Vegetable Garden, 1999 
 Jerry Baker's Flower Power!, 1999 
 Jerry Baker's Happy, Healthy House Plants, 1999
 Jerry Baker's Herbal Pharmacy, 2009
 Jerry Baker's Giant Book of Kitchen Counter Cures, 2001
 Jerry Baker's Oddball Ointments, Powerful Potions, and Fabulous Folk Remedies, 2002 
 Jerry Baker's Perfect Perennials!, 2003 
 Jerry Baker's Anti-Pain Plan, 2004 
 Jerry Baker's Backyard Problem Solver, 2004 
 Jerry Baker's Flower Garden Problem Solver, 2004 
 Jerry Baker's Giant Book of Garden Solutions, 2004 
 Jerry Baker's Terrific Garden Tonics!, 2004 
 Jerry Baker's Bug Off!, 2005 
 Jerry Baker's Supermarket Super Products!, 2005 
 Jerry Baker's Year-Round Bloomers, 2005 
 Grandma Putt's Old-Time Vinegar, Garlic, Baking Soda, and 101 More Problem Solvers, 2006
 Jerry Baker's Backyard Bird Feeding Bonanza, 2006
 Jerry Baker's Cut Your Health Care Bills in Half!, 2006
 Jerry Baker's Great Green Book of Garden Secrets, 2006 
 Jerry Baker's It Pays to be Cheap!, 2006 
 Nature's Best Miracle Medicines, 2006 
 Jerry Baker's Supermarket Super Remedies, 2006 
 Jerry Baker's Amazing Antidotes, 2007 
 Jerry Baker's Dear God...Please Help It Grow!, 2007 
 Jerry Baker's Green Grass Magic, 2007 
 Jerry Baker's Homespun Magic, 2007
 Jerry Baker's The New Healing Foods, 2007 
 Jerry Baker's Old-Time Gardening Wisdom, 2007 
 Secrets from the Jerry Baker Test Gardens, 2007 
 Grandma Putt's Home Health Remedies, 2008 3rd ed
 Jerry Baker's All-American Lawns, 2008
 Jerry Baker's Backyard Birdscaping Bonanza, 2008
 Jerry Baker's Supermarket Super Gardens, 2008
 Jerry Baker's Can the Clutter!, 2009
 Jerry Baker's Cleaning Magic, 2009
 Jerry Baker's Speed Cleaning Secrets!, 2009
 Jerry Baker's Terrific Tomatoes, Sensational Spuds, and Mouth-Watering Melons, 2009
 America's Best Practical Problem Solvers, 2010
 Healing Fixers, Mixers, and Elixirs, 201
 Home, Health, and Garden Problem Solver, 2011
 Jerry Baker's Ultimate Household Tonics Book, 2011 
 Jerry Baker's The New Impatient Gardener, 2012 
 Jerry Baker's Solve It with Vinegar!, 2012
 Jerry Baker's Top 25 Homemade Healers, 2014 
 Grandma Putt's Green Thumb Magic, 2015 
 Jerry Baker's Cure Your Lethal Lifestyle!, 2015 
 Healing Remedies Hiding in Your Kitchen, 2016 
 Jerry Baker's Fix It Fast and Make It Last!, 2016 
 Jerry Baker's Vinegar: The King of All Cures!, 2017
 Jerry Baker's Grow Younger, Live Longer!, 2017 
 Jerry Baker's Live Rich, Spend Smart, and Enjoy Your Retirement!
 Jerry Baker's Baker's Dozen, 2021
 Jerry Baker's Quick "Cures," Handy Hints, and Super Solutions, 2022

DVDs 
 Jerry Baker's Garden of Herbal Delights
 Jerry Baker's Gardening Wisdom
 Jerry Baker's Gardening Special—Lawn Problems
 Jerry Baker's Gardening Special—Flower Power
 Jerry Baker's Gardening Special—Tree, Shrub & Evergreen Care
 Jerry Baker's Super Growing Secrets
 Jerry Baker's Amazing Houseplants Tips & Tricks
 Jerry Baker's Lawn Care Tips & Tricks
 Jerry Baker's Year ‘Round Flower Care
 Jerry Baker's Year ‘Round Lawn Care
 Jerry Baker's Year ‘Round Rose Care
 Jerry Baker's Year ‘Round Tree, Shrub & Evergreen Care
 Jerry Baker's Year ‘Round Vegetable Gardening
 Jerry Baker's Around the Yard I
 Jerry Baker's Around the Yard II
 Jerry Baker's Garden Magic I
 Jerry Baker's Garden Magic II

References

External links
Official Jerry Baker website
What's Growin' On? -- Jerry Baker's blog

American male bloggers
American bloggers
American environmentalists
American gardeners
American garden writers
American male writers
American talk radio hosts
American television personalities
Writers from Michigan
1931 births
2017 deaths
21st-century American non-fiction writers